David Kessler may refer to:

 David Kessler (actor) (1860–1920), Yiddish theater
 David A. Kessler (born 1951), FDA Commissioner, university medical dean
 David R. Kessler (born 1957), Pennsylvania state representative, elected 2006
 David Kessler (author) (born 1957), English thriller writer
 David Kessler (writer) (born 1959), death and grieving expert
 David F. Kessler (1906–1999), managing director of The Jewish Chronicle
 David T. Kessler (born 1950), American artist
 David Kessler, character in An American Werewolf in London